Poland–Sweden relations are historical and bilateral relations between Poland and Sweden. Both countries are separated by the Baltic Sea and have had a very long historical contact. They have also survived several conflicts between the two countries as well. At the beginning of the 20th century, Poland and Sweden enjoyed a close relationship, which was interrupted by the Soviet and German invasion of Poland, which started World War II. After the war, both re-established relations and Sweden has become the largest economic contributor for Poland among the Nordic countries. Both Poland and Sweden are members of the EU, OECD, OSCE, Council of the Baltic Sea States, HELCOM, Council of Europe and the World Trade Organization. There are over 90,000 Poles in Sweden and residents from both countries visit each other frequently. Poland is a full member of NATO, Sweden is not a full member. Sweden has given full support to Poland's membership of the European Union. Poland strongly supports Sweden's NATO membership.

History

Relations between the nations date back to the Middle Ages. In the medieval period, Poland and Sweden entered into alliances several times, incl. in 1315, 1419 and 1454. In 1457, deposed King Charles VIII of Sweden was given refuge by Polish King Casimir IV Jagiellon, before he reclaimed the Swedish throne after his rival Christian I of Denmark was deposed from it in 1464. The Jagiellonian dynasty which ruled Poland from 1386 to 1596 was thought to have some Swedish ancestry and played a significant role in developing Poland into a major European power in the medieval days of Europe. One of Poland's most significant rulers, Sigismund III Vasa, was also partly Swedish through his father King John III of Sweden. Sigismund's mother was Polish Princess Catherine Jagiellon. Under the rule of Sigismund III both countries formed the Polish–Swedish union, which encompassed most of the Baltic region, and from 1561 to 1722, the two countries shared a common border in Livonia.

At the same time, both Poland, as part of the Polish–Lithuanian Commonwealth, and Imperial Sweden had ambitious plans to expand territorial gains and consolidate power, which led to many major conflicts between the two nations, challenging the power of each. Sweden invaded Poland several times, incl. in 1617, 1621, 1626, 1655 and 1701. The Swedish occupation of 1655–1660, known as the Swedish Deluge, had razed much of Poland after serious destructions by the Swedish invaders. It was one of the two most destructive invasions and occupations in Polish history (alongside the German-Soviet invasion and occupation in World War II). The population of Poland decreased by up to 40%, several hundred villages were destroyed. Swedish troops plundered countless heritage sights and art collections, and many Polish works of art and culture are still housed in Swedish museums and institutions today, as is the library of astronomer Nicolaus Copernicus, robbed from Poland during the earlier Swedish invasions. The weakening of Poland had been contributed by the brutal Swedish invasion. The successful Polish defense of Jasna Góra against several times more numerous Swedish forces grew to become a symbol of resistance in Poland. During the celebrations of the 350th anniversary of the battle in 2005, Ambassador of Sweden in Poland Tomas Bertelman apologized "for the suffering and destruction that the Swedish-led forces had caused in Poland".

In the 18th century, the partitions of Poland awoke Swedish fear of suffering a similar fate at the hands of Russia, but after the Russo-Swedish war ended in 1790, successful Swedish diplomatic missions prevented such an outcome, however, Sweden, similarly to Poland, lost large territories in the east to Russia in 1721 and 1809.

Sweden was the main destination for many immigrants from partitioned Poland. In 1797, Polish national hero Tadeusz Kościuszko stayed in Stockholm and Gothenburg.

During the Polish January Uprising of 1863–1864, various Swedish newspapers sympathized with the Poles, with some stating that Russia was a common enemy of Sweden and Poland. On March 2, 1863 a pro-Polish rally was organized in Stockholm, attended by a number of Swedish parliamentarians, and funds were collected for arms for the Polish insurgents. Over 30 committees of support for Poland were formed throughout Sweden. In February and March 1863 the Polish case was discussed in the Swedish Parliament, with many voices of support for the Poles but also some sceptical voices. No significant decisions were made. The Swedish government took a restrained stance, suggesting that Sweden could become more involved in helping Poland only alongside Western European powers such as Britain or France, therefore awaiting their decisions, whereas Swedish King Charles XV strongly supported Swedish involvement in the fight on the Polish side. In March 1863 meetings between Polish envoys and Swedish parliamentarians took place in Sweden, but despite a very ceremonial reception, the Poles did not gain stronger support from the Swedish authorities. In the spring of 1863, armed Polish volunteers from Western Europe assisted by foreigners of various nationalities attempted to reach partitioned Poland by sea via Sweden. Their expedition stopped on the island of Öland and in Malmö, where it was met with sympathy of the local Swedes. The Swedish authorities, fearing Russia, were forced to put the Poles under arrest, so the Poles departed in May 1863 to attempt a naval landing near Klaipėda. In the following months the Swedes continued to collect money to help the Polish insurgents.

During both World War I and World War II, the Polish community in Sweden were very supportive of independent Poland without being controlled by both the Germans and the Russians. Especially during World War II, several members of Home Army used Sweden, a neutral country, to facilitate and fund the Polish resistance. The Polish resistance movement, in cooperation with Polish outposts in Sweden, organized escapes of Poles from German-occupied Poland to Sweden by sea. The Polish and Swedish intelligence services cooperated with each other, as well as the Polish resistance and the Consulate of Sweden in Gdynia. The Polish resistance also facilitated escapes to Sweden by Jews rescued from the Holocaust and British, French and Russian prisoners of war escaping from German POW camps and forced labour camps. Swedish sailors generally helped in escapes, but there were occasional exceptions to this rule. In addition, secret correspondence between the Polish resistance in the occupied country and the Polish government-in-exile was smuggled through Sweden, and a portion of the Polish gold reserve, the part held in Lithuanian-annexed Wilno, was secretly evacuated to Sweden by the Poles with the help of the Japanese (see Japan–Poland relations).

In 1948, the Polish Veterans Association in Gothenburg was established by former Polish prisoners of Nazi German concentration camps, and in 1962 it was transformed into the Polish Cultural Association in Gothenburg. In 1973, the Polish Institute in Stockholm was founded. In 1975, a memorial to the victims of the Katyn massacre was unveiled in Stockholm by the local Polish community.

In July 2018, Poland sent 139 firefighters and 44 vehicles to Sweden, the largest such group from a foreign country to help extinguish the 2018 Sweden wildfires. The Polish firefighters were warmly welcomed by the Swedish population en route to the fires, and during the operation, they even saved the village of Kårböle from the fire.

Cooperation
Poland and Sweden are the scheduled hosts of the 2023 World Men's Handball Championship.

European Union
Sweden joined the EU in 1995. Poland joined the EU in 2004.

NATO 
While Poland became a member of NATO in 1999, Sweden has never been a member of NATO.

Resident diplomatic missions
 Poland has an embassy in Stockholm.
 Sweden has an embassy in Warsaw.

Honorary consulates
There are honorary consulates of Sweden in Kraków, Gdańsk, Katowice, Szczecin and Wrocław, and an honorary consulate of Poland in Gothenburg.

See also
 Embassy of Poland, Stockholm
 Poles in Sweden
 Swedes in Poland

References

External links
Polish embassy in Stockholm

 
Sweden
Bilateral relations of Sweden